Giongo is an Italian surname. Notable people with the surname include:

 Franco Giongo (1891–1981), Italian athlete
 Maria Cristina Giongo (born 1951), Italian journalist and author

See also
 Japanese sound symbolism

Italian-language surnames